Gary Martin St. Clair (born August 7, 1952) is an American retired soccer goalkeeper and coach. He played professionally in the North American Soccer League and was head coach at the high school, junior college, and college levels. From 1990 to 2013, St. Clair was head men's soccer coach at San Jose State University.

Player
St. Clair attended San Jose State University and played goalkeeper on the men's soccer team from 1970 to 1974. He earned a two all-conference and three all-region honors and has held the school record with 18 career shutouts. He graduated in 1976 with bachelor's degree and, in 1984, earned a master's degree from Saint Mary's College of California.

In the 1975 North American Soccer League draft, St. Clair was the ninth overall pick by the Dallas Tornado and was the first goalkeeper selected. St. Clair played three games for the San Jose Earthquakes in 1975 and three games for the San Diego Jaws in 1976. He was the starting goalkeeper for the U.S. national team during qualification for the 1976 Montreal Games.

Coaching career
After retiring as a player, St. Clair entered the coaching ranks. From 1977 to 1982, he was head coach at Leland High School in San Jose, with a cumulative 89-16-9 record and five conference championships. Then from 1983 to 1989, he was head coach at West Valley College, a junior college in Saratoga, accumulating a 75-21-14 record that included four conference championships.

In 1990, he was hired as head coach at San Jose State University, a position he would hold until 2013. He was 217-211-41 in 24 seasons. He was the Mountain Pacific Sports Federation Coach of the Year in 2000 & 2003. His 2000 Team set a school record with a 20-1-1 record which included being ranked #1 during the season by the National Soccer Coaches Association of America. Two of his players, CJ Brown and Ryan Suarez, played for the United States Men's National Team.

St. Clair returned to coaching in 2017 as head boys' soccer coach at Valley Christian High School in San Jose.

Head coaching record
The following section shows St. Clair's record in NCAA Division I coaching.

References

External links
 
 NASL stats
 San Jose State coaching bio

Living people
1952 births
American soccer coaches
American soccer players
Association football goalkeepers
North American Soccer League (1968–1984) players
National Professional Soccer League (1984–2001) players
San Diego Jaws players
San Jose Earthquakes (1974–1988) players
San Jose State Spartans men's soccer players